Giuseppe Verdi (1813–1901) is an Italian opera composer.

Verdi may also refer to:
Verdi (name)

Places

Verdi, Iran, a village in Markazi Province
Verdi, California, a census-designated place in Sierra County
Verdi, Kansas,  an unincorporated community in Ottawa County, Kansas
Verdi, Minnesota, an unincorporated community located in Verdi Township, Lincoln County
Verdi Township, Lincoln County, Minnesota
Verdi, Nevada
 Verdi Lake (Nevada), a glacial tarn in the Ruby Mountains of Elko County
 Verdi-Mogul, Nevada, former census-designated place (CDP) in Washoe County
 Verdi Peak (Nevada), a group of three mountain peaks in the Ruby Mountains of Elko County
Verdi Range, a mountain range in Sierra County, California
 Verdi (crater), an impact crater on Mercury

Other uses
Verdi (album), 2000 album by Andrea Bocelli
, a United States Navy patrol boat in commission from 1917 to 1918
Federation of the Greens, a political party in Italy, known colloquially as Verdi (Greens)
Federation of Green Lists, a former political party in Italy
V.E.R.D.I., acronym of Vittorio Emanuele, Re D’Italia, Victor Emmanuel II of Italy (1820–1878), the Italian unification movement, named after the composer Giuseppe Verdi (ardent supporter of the movement)
ver.di, Vereinte Dienstleistungsgewerkschaft (United Service Sector Union), German trade union